Bjugn is a former municipality in Trøndelag county, Norway. The municipality existed from 1853 until its dissolution in 2020 when it was merged into Ørland Municipality. It was part of the Fosen region.  The village of Botngård was the administrative centre of Bjugn municipality.  Other villages in Bjugn included Høybakken, Jøssund, Lysøysundet, Nes, Oksvoll, and Vallersund.  Bjugn was on the Robek-list in 2015.

At the time of its dissolution in 2020, the  municipality was the 245th largest by area out of the 422 municipalities in Norway. Bjugn was the 207th most populous municipality in Norway with a population of 4,864.

General information
The municipality of Bjugn was established in 1853 when it was separated from the large municipality of Ørland.  Initially, Bjugn had 2,903 residents.  On 26 March 1870, a royal resolution moved an unpopulated part of Aafjord to Bjugn.  On 1 January 1899, the municipality of Bjugn was divided into three municipalities.  The western district (population: 1,285) became the municipality of Nes.  The southern district (population: 2,166) became the municipality of Skjørn. The rest of the municipality (population: 1,256) remained the (much smaller) municipality of Bjugn.

During the 1960s, there were many municipal mergers across Norway due to the work of the Schei Committee. On 1 January 1964, the neighboring municipalities of Nes (population: 1,107), Jøssund (population: 1,917), Bjugn (population: 1,240), and the northern part of the municipality of Stjørna (population: 676) were all merged to create a new, larger municipality called Bjugn.  The population of Bjugn then increased from 1,240 to 4,940.

On 1 January 2018, the municipality switched from the old Sør-Trøndelag county to the new Trøndelag county.

On 1 January 2020, the neighboring municipalities of Bjugn and Ørland merged to become a single municipality called Ørland with its administrative centre at Botngård.

Name
The municipality is named after the old Bjugn farm since the first Bjugn Church was built there. The name is derived from the Old Norse word  which means "bent" or "crooked", probably referring to the bent/crooked path of the local fjord, the Bjugnfjorden.

Coat of arms
The coat of arms was granted on 17 February 1989 and it was in use until the municipality was dissolved on 1 January 2020. The official blazon is "Azure, a rudder Or". This means the arms have a blue field (background) and the charge is a rudder. The rudder has a tincture of Or which means it is commonly colored yellow, but if it is made out of metal, then gold is used. The blue color in the field and the rudder design symbolizes the historical importance of fishing in the municipality. The arms were designed by Einar H. Skjervold.

Churches
The Church of Norway had three parishes within the municipality of Bjugn. It was part of the Fosen prosti (deanery) in the Diocese of Nidaros.

Geography

The municipality of Bjugn is located on the Fosen peninsula on the mainland, plus many islands, including the Tarva islands.  The Asenvågøy Lighthouse is located in the far north of the municipality. The Bjugnfjorden and Stjørnfjorden both are located partially in Bjugn.

Neighboring Bjugn were the municipalities of Ørland to the southwest, Rissa to the south and southeast, and Åfjord to the northeast.

There are five nature reserves in Bjugn.

Sports
The Fosenhallen are an indoor multi-use ice rink. The Fosenhallen was used to host the 2014 World Junior Speed Skating Championships.

Government
While it existed, this municipality was responsible for primary education (through 10th grade), outpatient health services, senior citizen services, unemployment and other social services, zoning, economic development, and municipal roads. During its existence, this municipality was governed by a municipal council of elected representatives, which in turn elected a mayor. The municipality fell under the Fosen District Court and the Frostating Court of Appeal.

Municipal council
The municipal council of Bjugn was made up of 21 representatives that are elected to four year terms.  The party breakdown of the final municipal council was as follows:

Mayors
The mayors of Bjugn:

1857–1863: Rasmus Gaarder  	
1864–1867: Jacob H. Stuenæs 		
1868–1875: Lorentz Hegstad 	
1876–1881: Christian Jenssen (V)
1882–1889: Johan Arnt Hegvik (V)
1890–1891: Johan G. Haugen (V)
1892–1895: Hilmar M. Romstad (V)
1896–1898: Johan Arnt Hegvik (V)
1899–1905: Hilmar M. Romstad (V)
1906–1916: Johan G. Haugen (V)
1916–1922: Størk Hansen (V)
1923–1926: Johan Hegvik (V)
1926–1931: Claus Lien (Bp) 
1932–1934: Johan Hegvik (V)
1935–1941: Einar Furunes (Bp) 
1941–1945: Erling Hansen (NS)
1945-1945: Gustav Hyllmark (Bp) 
1945-1945: Einar Furunes (Bp) 
1946–1975: Alf Nebb (Sp)
1976–1983: Bjarne Nilsen (Sp)
1984–1987: Alf Nebb (Sp)
1988–1993: Morten Lund (Sp)
1993–1995: Helen Harsvik (Sp)
1995–1999: Arent M. Henriksen (SV)
1999–2014: Arnfinn Astad (Ap)
2014–2019: Ogne Undertun (Ap)

See also
List of former municipalities of Norway

References

External links

Municipal fact sheet from Statistics Norway 

 
Ørland
Former municipalities of Norway
1853 establishments in Norway
2020 disestablishments in Norway
Populated places disestablished in 2020